The 1983 UCLA Bruins football team was an American football team that represented the University of California, Los Angeles during the 1983 NCAA Division I-A football season.  In their eighth year under head coach Terry Donahue, the Bruins compiled a 7–4–1 record (6–1–1 Pac-10), finished in first place in the Pacific-10 Conference, and were ranked #17 in the final AP Poll.  The Bruins went on to defeat Illinois in the 1984 Rose Bowl. The Bruins began the season 0–3–1 before winning seven of their final eight games of the season.

UCLA's offensive leaders in 1983 were quarterback Rick Neuheisel with 2,245 passing yards, running back Kevin Nelson with 898 rushing yards, and wide receiver Mike Sherrard with 709 receiving yards. Neuheisel was selected as the 1984 Rose Bowl Most Valuable Player.

Schedule

Game summaries

USC

1984 NFL Draft
The following players were drafted into professional football following the season.

References

UCLA
UCLA Bruins football seasons
Pac-12 Conference football champion seasons
Rose Bowl champion seasons
UCLA Bruins football